The 1957–58 Serie A season was the 24th season of the Serie A, the top level of ice hockey in Italy. Six teams participated in the league, and Milan-Inter HC won the championship.

Regular season

External links
 Season on hockeytime.net

1957–58 in Italian ice hockey
Serie A (ice hockey) seasons
Italy